The 1921 Fresno State Bulldogs football team represented Fresno State Normal School—now known as California State University, Fresno—during the 1921 college football season. 1921 was the inaugural season of intercollegiate play for Fresno State. The Bulldogs competed as an independent in 1921 and became a charter member of the California Coast Conference (CCC) the following season. Emory Ratcliffe coached the team in practice until a permanent coach could be hired. Along came Arthur W. Jones, appointed "athletic coach," and leading the Bulldogs in football, basketball, and baseball that year. The 1921 Bulldogs were captained by end John Goree. They finished the season with a record of 2–4.

Schedule

References

Fresno State
Fresno State Bulldogs football seasons
Fresno State Bulldogs football